Isola del Gran Sasso d'Italia is a town and comune in province of Teramo in the Abruzzo region of southern Italy. It is located in the Gran Sasso e Monti della Laga National Park. The Gran Sasso mountain is the highest mountain in the Apennine chain in Italy.

References

External links
 Tourist web page for Isola del Gran Sasso

Cities and towns in Abruzzo